Kolkata BRTS is a proposed bus rapid transit system taken up by KMDA. Beginning at Ultadanga, the route will cover 15.5 km running along the E M Bypass to Garia. The corridor connects major growth centres like Ultadanga, Salt Lake, Tangra Metropolitan, Anandapur, Mukundapur and Patuli township.

Till date (February 2022), work is not completed with no updates from authorities. A decade worth of no advancement or updates indicates that this project was terminated in its initial stages. BRTS seems to have been overshadowed by its more glamorous kin — the metro.

Corridors 
The route will cover places like Ultadanga, the Kakurgachi access to EM Bypass, Apollo Hospital, the Phoolbagan access to EM Bypass, Salt Lake Stadium, Beliaghata, Chingrihata, Metropolitan, Mathpukur, Science City, Panchanangram, VIP Bazar, Tagore Park, Ruby Hospital, Mandir Para, Prince Anwar Shah Road, Singhabari, Mukundapur, Ajoy Nagar, Peerless Hospital, Patuli Ghosh Para, Baishnavghata-Patuli and Dhalai Bridge, Kumarkhali. Key junctions include Chingrihata, Paroma Island, Ruby Hospital and Prince Anwar Shah Road.

Alignment
The BRTS lane is proposed to be integrated with the E M Bypass.

Design speed
The speed design for the BRTS corridor is proposed to be around 50 km/h.

Integration of BRTS with other transits
The BRTS is proposed to be integrated with different modes of transits already existing or under construction or proposed for the city.

Project status

2011
March: Union Urban Development ministry clears proposal for the project. IVRCL is awarded the contract.

2014 
July: Not much progress as of now. Public estimated completion date 2018. No project plan made public by government.

2017 
January: Widening of roads are happening in some places. No major progress has been done so far. Metro work in E M Bypass can delay the progress.

See also
 Kolkata Metropolitan Development Authority

References 

Proposed bus rapid transit in India
Transport in Kolkata